Albert Narvel Felts (born November 11, 1938) is an American country music and rockabilly singer. Known for his soaring tenor and high falsetto, Felts enjoyed his greatest success during the 1970s, most famously 1975's "Reconsider Me".

Career
He was born in Keiser, Arkansas, United States, and raised in Bernie, Missouri, where he attended Bernie High School, Felts was discovered during a talent show at the school. He had been encouraged to participate in the show by some of his classmates, and a talent agent happened to be attending the performance at the time.

Felts recorded his first single, "Kiss-a Me Baby", at the age of 18, and his career skyrocketed with the help of Roy Orbison and Johnny Cash.  Felts enjoyed modest pop success in 1960 with a remake of the Drifters' "Honey Love", which earned a low position on the Billboard Hot 100. He went on to release such songs as "Lonely Teardrops" and "Pink And Black Days", but he did not begin enjoying success on a national level as a country singer until the 1970s. His first major hit came in 1973, with a cover of Dobie Gray's "Drift Away". Felts' version – number eight on the Billboard Hot Country Singles chart in September 1973 – was midtempo country compared to Gray's blues version. The follow-up single, "All in the Name of Love", just missed hitting the top 10 in December 1973.

Felts continued to enjoy modest success during the next year and a half, when he signed with ABC-Dot Records in 1975. That year, he enjoyed his biggest hit, a cover of Johnny Adams' soul classic "Reconsider Me", which showcased his falsetto and high tenor. The song reached number two that August, and was 1975's second-biggest country hit of the year.

Felts, who became known to fans as "Narvel the Marvel", continued to enjoy success throughout the 1970s. Included in his streak of hits was a remake of "Lonely Teardrops", which became his last top-10 hit in the summer of 1976, and a cover of Willie Nelson's "Funny How Time Slips Away". He also had a number-14 country hit with "Everlasting Love" in 1979.

Narvel Felts' pioneering contribution to the genre has been recognized by the Rockabilly Hall of Fame.

Personal life
He is married to the former Loretta Stanfield. 

Two children resulted from their marriage, although they lost their only son at the age of 31, Albert Narvel Jr. (known as Bub), on September 14, 1995, as the result of an automobile accident.  At one time, Bub played drums for his father.[1] 

One of his albums is dedicated to his son. 

He currently resides in Malden, Missouri, where he continues to perform on occasion.

Discography

Albums

Singles

References

External links
 Narvel Felts
 Narvel Felts – The Man and His Music – The Official Site

1938 births
Living people
American country singer-songwriters
American male singer-songwriters
People from Mississippi County, Arkansas
Groove Records artists
Singer-songwriters from Arkansas
People from Stoddard County, Missouri
Country musicians from Missouri
Country musicians from Arkansas
Singer-songwriters from Missouri